Laminga is a town in Nasarawa Local Government Area of Nasarawa State in central Nigeria.
The town sits along the Keffi - Nasarawa road, about 20 kilometers along the highway in the western part of Nasarawa state.

References 

Populated places in Nasarawa State